Bruno Petronio (30 January 1936 – 6 November 2002) was an Italian sailor who competed in the 1964 Summer Olympics.

References

External links
 

1936 births
2002 deaths
Olympic sailors of Italy
Italian male sailors (sport)
Sailors at the 1964 Summer Olympics – 5.5 Metre